Thomas Ray Hamer (May 4, 1864 – December 22, 1950) was a United States Representative from Idaho. Hamer served as a single term as a Republican in the House from 1909 to 1911, representing the state at-large. Hamer attended Hedding College, and Indiana University School of Law - Bloomington (now Indiana University Maurer School of Law), and was admitted to the bar and commenced practice in St. Anthony, Idaho, in 1893. He engaged in agricultural pursuits in Fremont County, Idaho before entering politics. He was a member of the Idaho House of Representatives in 1896 and served until 1898 when he enlisted as a private in the First Regiment, Idaho Volunteer Infantry and served as captain and lieutenant colonel in the Philippine–American War. After his term in congress, Hamer resumed his law practice in St. Anthony, Idaho engaging in banking at St. Anthony and Boise, Idaho. He would go on to once again serve in the military as a major and lieutenant colonel in the Judge Advocate General’s Department, during the First World War; After his service he would re-locate to Portland, Oregon and practice private law, until 1943, when he retired and moved to Los Angeles, California. He died in Phoenix, Arizona, on December 22, 1950, at the age of 86.

Hamer is the namesake of the city of Hamer, Idaho.

Notes

References

1864 births
1950 deaths
People from Vermont, Illinois
People from Boise, Idaho
People from St. Anthony, Idaho
Republican Party members of the Idaho House of Representatives
American military personnel of the Philippine–American War
Indiana University Maurer School of Law alumni
Republican Party members of the United States House of Representatives from Idaho
Lawyers from Portland, Oregon